Mad, Bad and Dangerous to Know is the third studio album by British pop band Dead or Alive, released on 21 November 1986 on Epic Records.  Continuing their association with the Stock Aitken Waterman (SAW) production team, Dead or Alive scored several hit singles from this album, including "Brand New Lover", "Something in My House", "Hooked on Love" and "I'll Save You All My Kisses".

Production of the album was marked by arguments between the band and SAW, with the latter frustrated by the band's refusal to branch into House music, and singer Pete Burns unwilling to hand over songwriting duties to the producers. Burns expressed frustration with his record company's attitude to his single choices, complaining the label only relented on scheduling "Brand New Lover" for release after Bananarama had a hit with their Dead or Alive-inspired cover of "Venus", and alleging they also refused to give "Something In My House" a Halloween release date.

While Burns claimed vicious studio arguments during production of the album made him ill, recording engineer Karen Hewitt stated the singer appeared to thrive on his often explosive and confrontational dynamic with Mike Stock and Matt Aitken during the album sessions. Aitken confessed to clashing with Burns over his experimentation with new vocal techniques, including what he described as yodelling.

The video for "Something in My House" was an homage in part to Jean Cocteau's film La Belle et la Bête (Beauty and the Beast). In addition to an image of singer Pete Burns, the cover features one of the game walls at the Château de Raray, where some of the scenes for La Belle et la Bête were filmed. The cover photographer is Bob Carlos Clarke.

The phrase "Mad, Bad, and Dangerous to Know" itself comes from a statement by Lady Caroline Lamb describing controversial English literary figure Lord Byron.

Track listing 
All tracks written by Dead or Alive.

Side one
"Brand New Lover" – 5:18
"I'll Save You All My Kisses" – 3:35
"Son of a Gun" – 4:15
"Then There Was You" – 3:45
"Come Inside" – 4:28

Side two
"Something in My House" – 7:20
"Hooked on Love" – 3:55
"I Want You" – 4:12
"Special Star" – 4:10

Personnel 
Dead or Alive
Pete Burns – vocals
Mike Percy – bass guitar, guitars
Tim Lever – keyboards
Steve Coy – drums

Additional personnel
Mike Stock – producer
Pete Waterman – producer
Matt Aitken – producer
Mark McGuire – engineer
Burni Adams – tape operator

Chart performance

References

External links

1986 albums
Dead or Alive (band) albums
Albums produced by Stock Aitken Waterman
Epic Records albums